Nina is a French television series. It has run since 2015 on France 2.

Plot 
At age 39, Nina begins a nursing career in the Madeleine Brès Hospital's internal medicine department, headed by her ex-husband Dr. Costa Antonakis. While taking care of her daughter Lily, who is suffering from cancer, she chooses to be a nurse, surreptitiously reviving Costa's war with his rival, Dr. Proust, and disturbing Costa's relationship with a young pediatrician.

Cast

Main Cast
 Annelise Hesme : Nina Auber (Season 1-3 : 28 Episodes)
 Thomas Jouannet : Dr. Costa Antonakis (Season 1-3 : 28 Episodes)
 Nina Melo : Léo Bonheur (Season 1-3 : 28 Episodes)
 Grégoire Bonnet : Dr. Samuel Proust (Season 1-3 : 28 Episodes)
 Alix Bénézech : Dorothée Ariès (Season 1-3 : 28 Episodes)
 Léa Lopez (Season 1-2) and Ilona Bachelier (Season 3) : Lily Antonakis (28 Episodes)
 Stéphane Fourreau : Pascal N'Guyen (Season 1-3 : 24 Episodes)
 Farid Elouardi : Dr. Djalil Bensaïd (Season 1-3 : 22 Episodes)
 Clément Moreau : Kevin Heurtaud (Season 1-3 : 22 Episodes)
 Marie-Christine Adam : Gloria Auber (Season 1-3 : 21 Episodes)

Supporting Cast
 Ambroise Michel : Fred (Season 1-3 : 17 Episodes)
 Marie Vincent : Nadine Leroy (Season 1-2 : 15 Episodes)
 Véronique Viel :  Maud (Season 1-3 : 14 Episodes)
 Muriel Combeau :  Gabrielle Vidal (Season 2-3 : 14 Episodes)
 Roman Magloire :  Néo (Season 2-3 : 14 Episodes)
 Jean-François Garreaud :  Antoine Auber (Season 1-3 : 13 Episodes)
 Sophie-Charlotte Husson : Dr. Caroline Bergman (Season 3 : 10 Episodes)
 Cédric Ben Abdallah : Julien di Maggio (Season 3 : 9 Episodes)
 Alexia Barlier : Dr. Hélène Maurier (Season 1 : 8 Episodes)
 Alexandre Tacchino : Will (Season 1-2 : 6 Episodes)
 Édouard Collin : Nicolas Bourget (Season 2 : 5 Episodes)
 Antoine Cholet :  Franck Bartel (Season 3 : 4 Episodes)
 Charline Paul : Clémence (Season 3 : 4 Episodes)

Guest
 Nicolas Gob : Tomer (Season 1, Episode 3)
 Pascal Elso : Pierre (Season 1, Episode 5)
 Éric Savin : Thierry (Season 1, Episode 6)
 Samir Guesmi : Ali (Season 1, Episode 6)
 Cécilia Cara : Lauren (Season 1, Episode 8)
 Julie de Bona : Juliette (Season 1, Episode 8)
 Frédéric Bouraly : Laurent Rousseau (Season 2, Episode 1)
 Tom Hudson : Jonas (Season 2, Episode 3)
 Alex Descas : Mathias (Season 2, Episode 4)
 Marion Game : Evelyne (Season 2, Episode 5)
 Béatrice Agenin : Guislaine Brunel (Season 2, Episode 6)
 Lucie Jeanne : Julie Brunel (Season 2, Episode 6)
 Armelle Deutsch : Christiana (Season 2, Episodes 7)
 Axelle Laffont : Victoire (Season 2, Episodes 7)
 Stéphan Guérin-Tillié : Eric Dumas (Season 2, Episode 8)
 Alicia Endemann : Flora (Season 2, Episodes 9 & 10)
 Frédérique Bel : Rita (Season 2, Episodes 10)
 Nicole Croisille : Marie-Odile (Season 3, Episode 1)
 Dounia Coesens : Lou Cordelier (Season 3, Episode 3)
 Philippe Lavil : Stéphane Cordelier (Season 3, Episode 3)
 Vanessa Demouy : Elodie Machard (Season 3, Episode 5)
 Doudou Masta : Gérard Bordin (Season 3, Episode 6)
 Stéphane Freiss : Dr. Lacombe (Season 3, Episode 9)
 Linda Hardy : Sabine (Season 3, Episode 10)
 Julien Boisselier : Antoine (Season 4)
 Catherine Jacob : Sylvie (Season 4)
 Marianne James : Valérie (Season 4)
 Christian Vadim : (Season 4)
 Francis Perrin : Gérard (Season 4)
 Cristiana Reali : (Season 4)
 Bruno Lochet : Marin (Season 5)

Production
The directors of the first season were Éric Le Roux and Nicolas Picard. The second season was directed by Le Roux, Hervé Brami and Adeline Darraux. Le Roux, Brami and Emmanuelle Dubergey also directed the third season.

Before the broadcast of the fourth season, a fifth season is already confirmed by the production.

Ratings
Legend
Green: highest
Red: lowest

Season 1 (2015)

Season 2 (2016)

Season 3 (2017)

Season 4 (2018)

References

External links

 Nina on Allociné

2010s French television series
2015 French television series debuts
France 2
France Télévisions television comedy
French medical television series
La Une original programming